Desmiphora boliviana is a species of beetle in the family Cerambycidae. It was described by Stephan von Breuning in 1948. It is known from Bolivia (from which its species epithet is derived) and French Guiana.

References

Desmiphora
Beetles described in 1948